The Royal Moroccan Handball Federation (RMHF) is the administrative and controlling body for handball and beach handball in the Kingdom of Morocco. Founded in 1960, RMHF is a member of African Handball Confederation (CAHB) and the International Handball Federation (IHF).

National teams
 Morocco men's national handball team
 Morocco men's national junior handball team
 Morocco women's national handball team

References

External links
 Official website  
 Morocco at the IHF website.
 Morocco at the CAHB website.

Handball in Morocco
Handball
Sports organizations established in 1960
1960 establishments in Morocco
Handball governing bodies
African Handball Confederation
National members of the International Handball Federation
Organizations based in Rabat